Rudolf Riives (18 June 1890 Vana-Kuuste Parish, Tartu County – 23 June 1941 Tallinn) was an Estonian military officer (captain) and politician. He was a member of VI Riigikogu (its Chamber of Deputies).

References

1890 births
1941 deaths
Members of the Riigivolikogu
Russian military personnel of World War I
Estonian military personnel of the Estonian War of Independence
20th-century Estonian military personnel
Estonian people executed by the Soviet Union
People from Kambja Parish